"Never Make A Promise" is a number-one R&B song by group Dru Hill, released in 1997. It is the third single from their eponymous debut album. With a lead by Larry "Jazz" Anthony, the single spent four weeks at number one on the US R&B chart and peaked at number seven on the US pop chart. Although it was a hit, sales of the "Never Make A Promise" single were mainly driven by the popular So So Def Remix of their previous hit "In My Bed" only being available on its B-side.

Music video
The music video was directed by Frank Sacramento. The music video features an appearance by actress Michelle Thomas, who plays Jazz's girlfriend. She tells Jazz that she is pregnant and he gets excited; but she also has a drunk father who rapes her but she is too scared to tell anyone.

Track listing

Personnel
Credits adapted from liner notes.

Mark "Sisqo" Andrews, James "Woody" Green, Tamir "Nokio" Ruffin and Larry "Jazz" Anthony : lead and background vocals
Daryl Simmons : writer, composer, producer, keyboards and drum programming
Ronnie Garrett : bass
Thom "TK" Kidd : engineer
Jon Gass : mixing engineer
Kevin Lively : assistant engineer
Ivy Skoff : production coordinator

Charts and certifications

Weekly charts

Year-end charts

Certifications

|}

See also
List of number-one R&B singles of 1997 (U.S.)

References

1997 singles
Dru Hill songs
Island Records singles
1997 songs
Songs written by Daryl Simmons
Song recordings produced by Daryl Simmons
Contemporary R&B ballads
Soul ballads